Rostov-on-Don is a port city and the administrative centre of Rostov Oblast and the Southern Federal District of Russia. It lies in the southeastern part of the East European Plain on the Don River,  from the Sea of Azov, directly north of the North Caucasus. The southwestern suburbs of the city lie above the Don river delta. Rostov-on-Don has a population of over one million people, and is an important cultural centre of Southern Russia.

History

Early history
From ancient times, the area around the mouth of the Don River has held cultural and commercial importance. Ancient indigenous inhabitants included the Scythian and Sarmatian tribes. It was the site of Tanais, an ancient Greek colony, Fort Tana under the Genoese, and Fort Azak in the time of the Ottoman Empire.

In 1749, a custom house was established on the Temernik River, a tributary of the Don, by edict of the Empress Elizabeth, the daughter of Peter the Great, in order to control trade with Turkey. It was co-located with a fortress named for Dimitry of Rostov, a metropolitan bishop of the old northern town of Rostov the Great. Azov, a town closer to the Sea of Azov on the Don, gradually lost its commercial importance in the region to the new fortress.

In 1756, the "Russian commercial and trading company of Constantinople" was founded at the "merchants' settlement" (Kupecheskaya Sloboda) on the high bank of the Don. Towards the end of the eighteenth century, with the incorporation of previously Ottoman Black Sea territories into the Russian Empire, the settlement lost much of its militarily strategic importance as a frontier post.

In 1796, the settlement was chartered and in 1797, it became the seat of Rostovsky Uyezd within Novorossiysk Governorate. In 1806, it was officially renamed Rostov-on-Don. During the 19th century, due to its river connections with Russia's interior, Rostov developed into a major trade centre and communications hub. A railway connection with Kharkiv was completed in 1870, with further links following in 1871 to Voronezh and in 1875 to Vladikavkaz.

Concurrent with improvements in communications, heavy industry developed. Coal from the Donets Basin and iron ore from Krivoy Rog supported the establishment of an iron foundry in 1846. In 1859, the production of pumps and steam boilers began. Industrial growth was accompanied by a rapid increase in population, with 119,500 residents registered in Rostov by the end of the nineteenth century along with approximately 140 industrial businesses. The harbour was one of the largest trade hubs in southern Russia, especially for the export of wheat, timber, and iron ore.

In 1779, Rostov-on-Don became associated with a settlement of Armenian refugees from Crimea at Nakhichevan-on-Don. The two settlements were separated by a field of wheat. In 1928, the two towns were merged. The former town border lies beneath the Teatralnaya Square of central Rostov-on-Don. By 1928, following the incorporation of the hitherto neighbouring city of Nakhichevan-on-Don, Rostov had become the third largest city in Russia.

In the early 20th century, epidemics of cholera during the summer months were not uncommon.

20th century

During World War I Rostov-on-Don was briefly occupied by the Germans and Austrians, during 1918.

During the Russian Civil War, the Whites and the Reds contested Rostov-on-Don, then the most heavily industrialized city of South Russia. By 1928, the regional government had moved from the old Cossack capital of Novocherkassk to Rostov-on-Don.

In the Soviet years, the Bolsheviks demolished two of Rostov-on-Don's principal landmarks: St. Alexander Nevsky Cathedral (1908) and St. George Cathedral (1783–1807).

During World War II, German forces occupied Rostov-on-Don, at first from 19/20 November 1941 to 2 December 1941, after attacks by the German First Panzer Army in the Battle of Rostov and then for seven months from 24 July 1942 to 14 February 1943. The town was of strategic importance as a railway junction and a river port accessing the Caucasus, a region rich in oil and minerals. It took ten years to restore the city from the damage during World War II.

In 1942 up to 30,000 Russian Jews were massacred by the German military in Rostov-on-Don at a site called Zmievskaya Balka.

Modern period 
In 2018, Rostov-on-Don hosted several matches of the FIFA World Cup.

Government

Within the framework of administrative divisions, it is incorporated as Rostov-na-Donu Urban Okrug—an administrative unit with the status equal to that of the districts. As a municipal division, this administrative unit also has urban okrug status.

City districts
Rostov-on-Don is divided into eight city districts:

Demographics
The 2010 census recorded the population of Rostov-on-Don at 1,089,261 making it the tenth most populous city in Russia.

At the time of the official 2010 Census, the ethnic makeup of the city's population whose ethnicity was known (1,066,523) was:

Geography

Climate 
Albert Parry, born in 1901 in Rostov-on-Don, wrote of the summers of his childhood:
There were sultry days of brassy sun, but also cool evenings on the balconies facing the Don River, with the soft glow of charcoal in the samovar, with the ripe cherries crushed by your spoon against the bottom and sides of your glass of scalding tea.

Rostov-on-Don lies in a humid continental climate (Köppen: Dfa). The lowest recorded temperature of  occurred in January 1940.

Summers are warm and humid; July temperatures average .

Symbols

In December 1996, Rostov-on-Don adopted a coat of arms, a flag and a mayoral decoration as the symbols of the town. The first coat of arms of Rostov-on-Don was designed in 1811 and approved by the Tsar. In 1904, some changes were made. One lasting oil painting of the coat-of-arms is kept in the regional local history museum but its accuracy and authenticity is uncertain. In June 1996, the Rostov-on-Don City Duma adopted a variant of the coat-of-arms in which a tower represents the St. Dimitry Rostovsky Fortress. The ancient Russian arms reference the role Rostov played in the defense of Russia's borders. The coat-of-arms adorns the mayor's decoration but all other cases of its use are first considered for approval by the City Duma.

Flag

The flag of Rostov-on-Don was approved by the Duma on September 20, 1864. At the end of the 19th and beginning of the 20th centuries the home guard regiments, which defended the Southern borders of Russia, were raised under this flag. The "Flag of Rostov" is kept in the town's municipal building under glass. The flag is taken out of the building only on Victory Day and Rostov-on-Don Day by a guard of honour.

In 1870, an oval shape mayoral decoration wrought from precious or semi-precious white metal was introduced. On the front is written "Rostov-on-Don" at the top, the Rostov-on-Don coat-of-arms is in the center and the inscription, "Mayor of the City" is written at the bottom. On its reverse side, the day of its adoption, April 9, 1996, is recorded. The decoration is worn over the suit on a large chain. The mayor returns the decoration to the Duma on his or her retirement from office.

The Emblem of the Don Host Oblast was introduced in July 5 (18), 1878. The flag of the All Great Don Army was introduce in May 1918 on the "Circle of the Don Saving".

Awards
December 1970: Order of Lenin
1982: Order of the Great Patriotic War 1st class
2008: City of Military Glory status

Economy

Overview

Rostov's favourable geographical position at trading crossroads promotes economic development. The Don River is a major shipping lane connecting southwestern Russia with the north. Rostov-on-Don is a trading port for Russian, Italian, Greek and Turkish merchants selling, for example, wool, wheat and oil. It is also an important river port for passengers. The Rostov-on-Don agricultural region produces one-third of Russia's vegetable oil from sunflowers.

Volga–Don Canal
With the construction of the Volga-Don Shipping Canal in 1952, Rostov-on-Don has become known as a "port of five seas" (reachable from the Black Sea, the Sea of Azov, the Caspian Sea, the White Sea, and the Baltic Sea). See the article Port of Rostov-on-Don

Modern industry
In modern times, Rostov-on-Don has experienced economic growth. Numerous start-up companies have established headquarters in the city, the median income is increasing, and the city is being transformed into a modern, industrial and technology-rich hub. For instance, Rostov-on-Don is a center for helicopter and farm machinery manufacturing. The "Tebodin" engineering company opened its fourth office in Rostov-on-Don in June 2010.

Transportation

Public transport in Rostov-on-Don includes buses, trolleybuses, trams, and marshrutkas (routed minibus, usually a 17-passenger Mercedes Sprinter). The Rostov Metro was planned in the early 90s and later in 2000s and 2010s. At the end of 2021, the Government of the Rostov Region and the Sinara company signed an agreement on the creation of a high-speed tramway in Rostov-on-Don on a concession basis. This happened at the international forum Transport Week 2021 in Moscow. By signing this agreement, the regional government put an end to the idea of developing the metro in the city in favour of the tram.

The Rostov-on-Don Airport caters for domestic travel, as well as flights to and from the former C.I.S., Europe, Africa and Asia. Its IATA code is "ROV". Donavia airlines (formerly "Aeroflot Don") has its head office in Rostov-on-Don. Platov International Airport was opened in late 2017 as part of preparations for the 2018 FIFA World Cup.

The international river port specializes in the packaging and freighting of minerals and timber. Shipping information is published on line.

The main railway stations in Rostov-on-Don are "Rostov-Glavny" and "Rostov-Prigorodny". The "St. Petersburg-Rostov-Caucasus" railway crosses the territory of Rostov-on-Don. The North Caucasus Railway Administration Building is in Rostov-on-Don.

Several highways of federal and regional significance cross Rostov. The M-4 “Don” route passes Rostov to the east and crosses the Don river in the Aksay city area. The “Rostov-Novoshakhtinsk” starts from the Northern housing block area of the city running north to connect with the M-4 “Don” route between Shakhty and Novoshakhtinsk.

The Greater Rostov supercity

The Ministry of Regional Development of Russia has prepared a program to create eight multimillion conglomerate population centres or 'super cities'. The Rostov Oblast will be one of these. “The Greater Rostov” metropolitan area will include the cities of Rostov-on-Don, Novocherkassk, Taganrog, Aksay, Bataysk and Azov.

Communications
In 1929, the first automatic telephone exchange in Russia with a capacity of 6,000 numbers commenced in Rostov-on-Don. Since 2004, standard telephone numbers in Rostov-on-Don have been seven digits in length. Since 2009, city numbers have begun with "2". The city dialing code is "863".

Financial services
The first commercial bank in the South of Russia, Rostovsoсbank, was opened in Rostov-on-Don. The bank existed from 1989 to 1989, and before the withdrawal of the banking license it made a full return of deposits to all depositors.  The largest bank in the Rostov region is Center-Invest. In total, there are about 50 banks and their branches, 17% local banks, 80% representative offices of federal banks, 4% representative offices of foreign banks.

Education
Rostov-on-Don hosts higher educational establishments, including universities, academies, secondary schools of vocational training including colleges, technical schools, specialized schools, and elementary schools of vocational training including lyceums, professional colleges and schools of general education.

The largest educational establishments of the city include:

Southern Federal University
Don State Technical University
Rostov State University of Economy
Rostov State University of Transport Routes (The Railway Engineers' University)
Rostov State University of Civil Engineering
Rostov State Medical University
Rostov State Conservatory named after Sergei Rachmaninoff
Branch of the Moscow State Academy named after F.F. Ushakov
Rostov Eparchy Religious College
Rostov Institute of Advocacy of Entrepreneurs
Rostov Institute of Foreign Languages
Rostov International Institute of Economy and Management
Rostov Juridical Institute of Ministry of Internal Affairs of the Russian Federation
Rostov Institute of Physical Training and Sports (branch of the Cuban State University of Physical Training, Sports and Tourism)
Rostov Social & Economic Institute
Rostov branch of Moscow Institute of Economy, Management and Law
South-Russian Institute of the Humanities
North-Caucasian Academy of Public Service
North-Caucasian Institute of Anthropology and Applied Psychology
The Modern University for the Humanities
Russian State University of Trade & Economy
Institute of Management, Business and Law,
Rostov Institute of Law of the Russian Juridical Academy of the Russian Federation
Rostov State Academy of Architecture and Arts,
Rostov College of Arts named after M.B. Grekov.

There is also a French cultural centre (Alliance Francaise), a British Council and German Goethe Institute (DAAD and Bosch foundation), and a Korean Cultural Centre.

Culture

The most conspicuous architectural feature of the central part of the city is the Cathedral of Virgin's Nativity (1860–1887), designed by Konstantin Thon.

Libraries
Rostov-on-Don's libraries include:
The Don State Public Library,
Central Library named after Maxim Gorky,
Regional Children's Library named after V.M. Velichkina
Rostov Regional Special Library for the Blind,
Scientific Library of the Medical University,
Central State Children's Library named after Lenin
Children's Library named after A.S. Pushkin
Children's Library named after Mayakovsky
South-Russian Don State Public Library.

Theaters
In the Academic Drama Theater named after Maxim Gorky works Mikhail Bushnov, who is the national artist of the USSR and an honorary citizen of Rostov-on-Don.

Maxim Gorky Academic Drama Theater
Rostov State Puppet Theater
Rostov Regional Academic Theater of the Youth
Rostov Musical Theater
Philharmonic centre
Theater 18+
Kim Nazaretov jazz centre

Museums
The small collections of the Art Gallery and the Museum of Arts include some works by Repin, Surikov, Perov, Levitan, Aivazovsky as well as of modern Rostov artists.

Museum of Local Lore
Rostov Regional Museum of Fine Arts
Museum of Fine Arts on Dmitrovskaya
Museum of Russian & Armenian Friendship
Pioneer and Railway Museum and Children's Railway

Other facilities

Other facilities include seven stadiums, a Palace of Sports, a circus, a zoo botanical gardens and parks. Rostov-on-Don hosts the North Caucasian Science Center and research institutes.  The city is also home to a Starbucks coffee chain, a true rarity in this geographical area of Russia.

Religion
The Administration of Rostov and Novocherkassk Eparchy of the Russian Orthodox Church is located in Rostov. Other religious facilities in Rostov-on-Don are the Roman Catholic "Church of the Lord's Supper", the Old Believers' temple, a synagogue, a mosque, and the Diamond Way Buddhist Center of the Karma Kagyu Tradition. There are also several Armenian and Greek Orthodox churches in the city, with one of the Armenian churches being the oldest standing building in Rostov. All of the Armenian churches are in the Nakhichevan-on-Don district of the city.

Russian Orthodox churches 

 Church of the Intercession
 Annunciation Greek Orthodox Church (belongs to Moscow Patriarchate)
 St. Alexandra's Church
 Ascension Church
 Cathedral of the Nativity of the Blessed Virgin Mary
 Church of St. John of Kronstadt, Rostov-on-Don

Old Believers churches 
 Old Believers Pokrovsky Cathedral

Armenian Apostolic Church 
 Church of the Resurrection, Rostov-on-Don

Synagogues 
See also List of synagogues in Russia and History of the Jews in Rostov-on-Don
 Soldier Synagogue, currently home to the Rostov Jewish Community and the only active synagogue in Rostov-on-Don
 Main Choral Synagogue, no longer in active use as a synagogue
 The Artisans' Synagogue, destroyed by fire during WWII, formerly located at 106 Stanislavskogo St.

Mosques 
 Cathedral Mosque

Gallery

Mass media

The construction of the Rostov TV centre began in 1956 and was completed on 26 April 1958. The first television program was broadcast on 30 April 1958. Colour television was first broadcast in 1974. Radio transmission began in Rostov-on-Don on October 17, 1975. In 2009, there were fourteen FM radio stations in Rostov-on-Don, it is also possibly, home of the Squeaky Wheel number station.

Sports
Rostov-on-Don is one of the host cities for the 2018 FIFA World Cup.

2018 FIFA World Cup 

In 2018, Rostov-on-Don was one of the Russian cities to host the 2018 FIFA World Cup. Rostov Arena with a capacity of 45,000 spectators was built on the left bank of the Don River, left of the exit from the city via the Voroshilovsky Bridge.
The stadium hosted 5 games of the FIFA World Cup.
 June 17, 21:00, Brazil — Switzerland, Group E
 June 20, 18:00, Uruguay — Saudi Arabia, Group A
 June 23, 18:00, South Korea — Mexico, Group F
 June 26, 21:00, Iceland — Croatia, Group D
 July 2, 21:00, Belgium — Japan, Round of 16
During the FIFA World Cup, the Teatralnaya Square served as a venue for the FIFA Fan Fest. The specially arranged area had a capacity of 25,000 people. Fans were able to watch all World Cup games on a big screen. The venue was serviced by food outlets and had several entertainment areas.
In preparation for the FIFA World Cup, the city implemented a large-scale development program. Apart from the new stadium, the city built a camping area for fans arriving for the World Cup, the Southern and Western Bypasses, and new hotels. Reconstruction works were carried out at the bridge crossing over the Don River (expanding the traffic way to 6 lanes), a number of healthcare facilities, and the embankment area. A new airport, Yuzhny, was built.

Notable people

Notable people include Olga Spessivtseva ballet dancer, Alexander Suvorov military commander, Yelena Produnova artistic gymnast, Yulia Belokobylskaya artistic gymnast, Andrei Chikatilo (1936–1994) serial killer, and Alexander Pechersky (1909–1990) a leader of the rebellion at the Sobibor extermination camp, and Maria Kharenkova artistic gymnast.

Writers and poets
Authors of Rostov-on-Don include Anton Chekhov, Mikhail Sholokhov, Zakrutkin, Fadeyev, Safronov, Kalinin, Alexander Pushkin, Maxim Gorky, Sergey Yesenin, Shushanik Kurghinian, Aleksey Nikolayevich Tolstoy, Alexander Solzhenitsyn, Yuri Zhdanov and Mikael Nalbandian. After visiting Rostov in 1831, Pushkin published his poem "The Don". The monument to Pushkin on Pushkin Boulevard is dedicated to these events. Maxim Gorky, worked as a docker in Rostov-on-Don in his youth. Vera Panova (1905–1973) was a Soviet era writer. Modern era includes such names as Danil Korezky and Tony Vilgotsky. A monument to Aleksandr Solzhenitsyn, who lived in the city for 18 years and studied mathematics at Rostov University, is being planned by city authorities.

A monument to Anton Chekhov (see Chekhov Monument in Rostov-on-Don) was erected in 2010.

Musicians, composers and singers
Musicians from Rostov-on-Don include Efrem Zimbalist the violinist, Zaslavsky, Kim Nazaretov, Modest Mussorgsky, composers Andrey Pashchenko (1885–1972), film composer Nadezhda Simonyan, Zinaida Petrovna Ziberova (born 1909), the pop music singer Irina Allegrova (1952), Yuri Bashmet, Sergey Vladimirovich Rodionov, Eva Rivas (1987), Mikhail Puntov (1995), the post-punk rock band Motorama, rapper Basta and the rap band Kasta.

Actors, directors and playwrights
Actors and playwrights of Rostov-on-Don include Maretskaya, Mikhail Shchepkin, Yevgeniya Glushenko, Alexander Kaidanovsky (1946–1995), Evgeny Shvarts (1896–1958), Nikolai Sorokin (1952–2013), Konstantin Lavronenko (1961), film and theater director Kirill Serebrennikov (1969) winner of the Best Actor award at the 2007 Cannes Film Festival, and Sergey Zhigunov (1963). Marion Gering, noted for his stage and film productions in the United States, was born in the city.

Architects and artists
Architects and artists of the city include Yevgeny Vuchetich, Seyran Khatlamajyan, Ashot Melkonian, Natalia Duritskaya, Martiros Saryan (1880–1972), Roman Chatov (1900–1987), Leonid Eberg (1882–1954), and Lev Eberg (1907–1982).

Scientists and adventurers
Scientists and explorers include, doctors N. Bogoraz and S. Fedosov, scientists Dmitri Mendeleev, A. S. Popov, I. P. Pavlov, George Sedov the Arctic Sea explorer, Yakov Frenkel (1894–1952) a solid-state physicist, Svyatoslav Fyodorov (1927–2000), ophthalmologist, Sabina Spielrein (1885–1942), psychoanalyst, Yuri Oganessian (a nuclear physicist who is the namesake of oganesson (element 118)).

Other
Vladimir Shumeyko (1945), political figure
Svetlana Boyko (1972), foil fencer
Anatoly Morozov (1973), professional association football player and coach
Alexei Eremenko (1983), Russian-born Finnish professional association football player who currently plays in Kazakhstan
Victoria Lopyreva (1983), model and popular television hostess
Tatiana Kotova (1985), beauty pageant titleholder
Andrei Chikatilo (1936–94), serial killer
Ivan Bukavshin (1995–2016), chess grandmaster
Iosif Vorovich (1920–2001), mathematician, academician, full member of the Russian Academy of Sciences

Tourism

Central Market, local bazaars and fresh fish markets
Bridges over the Don river and Don Embankment
Don River lookout
Armenian Holy Cross Church
Rostovchanka statue
River Steamboat rides
Orthodox Cathedral of the Nativity of the Holy Virgin
Pushkinskaya Street
Maxim Gorky Park
Traditional Cossack villages (stanitsas)
National Sholokhov Museum-Reserve
Azov ancient fortress
Rostov circus
Rostov state opera and ballet theatre
Monastery of St. Jacob
Rostov Zoo
Museum of North Caucasus Railway
Botanical Garden of Southern Federal University
Art Gallery 16th Line
Alexander Column
Grigory and Aksinya in a boat
Park of Aviators
October Park
Anatoly Sobino Park

Historic buildings

Argutinsky-Dolgorukov House
Bahchisaraytsev House
Bostrikiny House
Chernov House
Chernova House
Chirikov House
F. N. Solodov House
Gavala House
Gayrabetov Mansion
Gench-Ogluev House
Gymnasium №36
Ivan Zvorykin House
Kechekyan Mansion
Kisin House
Kostanayev House
Kostin House
Kramer Mansion
Krasilnikov Mansion
Kushnarev House
Leonidov House
Lyakhmayer House
Lyceum № 13
Main building of Warsaw University
Maksimov House
Martyn Brothers House
Masalitina House
N. A. Semashko City Hospital No. 1
North Caucasus Railway Administration Building
Paramonov Mansion
Paramonov Mill
Paramonov Warehouses
Petrov Mansion
Pivovarova House
Popov Mansion
Reznichenko House
Sariyev House
Shirman House
Spielrein Mansion
Trunov House

Twin towns/sister cities

Rostov-on-Don is twinned with:

 Antalya, Turkey

 Dortmund, Germany
 Gera, Germany
  Donetsk, Ukraine
 Glasgow, Scotland
 Kajaani, Finland
 Le Mans, France
 Minsk, Belarus
 Mobile, United States
 Pleven, Bulgaria
 Seville, Spain
 Volos, Greece
 Yantai, China
 Yerevan, Armenia
 Toronto, Canada

Gallery

References

Sources

Bibliography

External links

Official website of Rostov-on-Don 

 
Don Host Oblast
Populated places established in 1749
History of the Don Cossacks
1749 establishments in Europe
Port cities and towns of the Azov Sea
Cities and towns in Rostov Oblast